Melissa Meyer (born May 4, 1946) is an American painter. The Wall Street Journal has referred to her as a "lighthearted Abstract Expressionist".

Life and work
Meyer received a fellowship at the American Academy in Rome in 1980, two National Endowment for the Arts grants (1983, 1993), the National Academy 183rd Invitational Eric Isenburger Annual Award (2008) and a Pollock-Krasner Foundation Grant (2009). In the late 1970s Meyer and Miriam Schapiro collaborated on a Heresies article entitled Femmage.

In 1997 her sketchbooks were published in facsimile by the Mezzanine Gallery of the Metropolitan Museum of Art.

Melissa Meyer's paintings and works on paper are in the collections of The Museum of Modern Art, The Metropolitan Museum of Art,  The Brooklyn Museum,  and The Jewish Museum,

References 

1946 births
Living people
20th-century American painters
21st-century American painters
Painters from New York City
American women painters
20th-century American women artists
21st-century American women artists